Roger Raupp (born October 1, 1963 in Elkhorn, Wisconsin) is an artist whose work has appeared in games such as the Dungeons & Dragons fantasy role-playing game from TSR, and the collectible card game Magic: the Gathering from Wizards of the Coast.

Early life
According to Roger Raupp, he "was into science fiction as a kid, but my parents were quite conservative and thought I was a little nuts. They wanted me to work on the farm, not sit around and read comic books and watch Godzilla movies all day." Raupp developed an interest in art during childhood, and began playing the Dungeons & Dragons fantasy role-playing game while in high school. As a freshman, Raupp "was doing some art for a student magazine, which happened to be printed at the same plant where Dragon had camera work done. Tim Kask, who was then the editor of Dragon, happened to see some of my science-fiction and fantasy pieces, and told my art teacher to have me bring in a portfolio." Dave Sutherland reviewed the samples, and told him to keep working; several months later, Raupp got his first assignment for an illustration for Dragon.

Career
Raupp joined the Dragon staff on a part-time basis three years later doing art and cartography, and about a year he was hired full-time. Raupp eventually became the Art Director for Dragon, Strategy & Tactics, and Polyhedron, doing layout, keylining, graphic design, cartography, and some of the art for the magazines. Raupp produced the covers for Avalon Hill's "RuneQuest Renaissance" books.

Works
Roger Raupp was an interior artist on such Dungeons & Dragons books as the first edition Unearthed Arcana and Oriental Adventures. He worked as a cover artist on some Avalon Hill products, and produced interior art for products from Mayfair Games, Iron Crown Enterprises, Hero Games, Rubicon Games, Daedalus Games, and Atlas Games, as well as art for two Magic: the Gathering sets. As Rudy Rauben he published The Medicine Show.

Personal life
In 2007 Raupp changed to his name to Rudy Didier Rauben.

References

External links

1963 births
Fantasy artists
Game artists
Living people
People from Elkhorn, Wisconsin
Role-playing game artists